Iqbal Mehdi may refer to:

 Eqbal Mehdi (1946–2008), Pakistani painter
 Iqbal Mehdi (politician), Pakistani politician